Patrick MacCarvill (23 May 1893 – 16 March 1955) was an Irish politician and medical doctor. He was born in Raw, County Monaghan, the son of farmers John McCarvill and Susan Moyna. 

He was elected as an anti-Treaty Sinn Féin Teachta Dála (TD) to the 3rd Dáil at the 1922 general election for the Monaghan constituency but did not take his seat because of the absentionist policy of Sinn Féin. 

MacCarvill studied at University College Dublin (UCD) and was a medical doctor, as was his son. Prior to being fully qualified MacCarvill helped in training of members of Cumann na mBan after the 1916 Easter Rising, and during the Irish War of Independence in first aid in Harcourt Street, along with Kathleen Lynn and Dr Geraghty. During his time in UCD he played Gaelic football winning the Sigerson Cup medals in 1917 and 1918. He also played soccer which caused him difficulties with the GAA in the College.
 
His selection as candidate for the 1922 general election was controversial since the anti-Treaty side selected MacCarvill instead of outgoing TD Seán MacEntee. The pro-Treaty side claimed this breached the electoral pact which would have resulted in two pro-Treaty and one anti-Treaty candidates being elected without a contest. As a result of the selection of MacCarvill, the pro-Treaty side stood an independent candidate Thomas McHugh which forced an election. MacCarvill was elected.

He was re-elected at the 1923 general election and once again did not take his seat. He was elected as a Fianna Fáil TD at the June 1927 general election and took his seat on 12 August 1927 along with the other Fianna Fáil TDs. He did not contest the September 1927 general election, being succeeded as Fianna Fáil TD by Conn Ward.

MacCarvill was an unsuccessful candidate at the 1948 general election in Monaghan for Clann na Poblachta.

References

1893 births
1955 deaths
20th-century Irish medical doctors
Alumni of University College Dublin
Clann na Poblachta politicians
Early Sinn Féin TDs
Fianna Fáil TDs
Members of the 3rd Dáil
Members of the 4th Dáil
Members of the 5th Dáil
Politicians from County Monaghan